Tigmanshu Dhulia (born 3 July 1967) is an Indian film dialogue writer, director, actor, screenwriter, producer and casting director known for his works in Hindi cinema and Television. He wrote the dialogue for the 1998 film Dil Se.., the first Bollywood film to chart in the UK top ten, and screened at the Berlin International Film Festival.  His directing career has also garnered international recognition with the biographical film, Paan Singh Tomar premiered at the 2010 BFI London Film Festival. and the thriller drama Saheb, Biwi Aur Gangster.

Paan Singh Tomar eventually went on to win the National Film Award for Best Feature Film in 2012. Similarly, his sequel film Saheb, Biwi Aur Gangster Returns had gained critical acclaim. He is also well known for his role as Ramadhir Singh in Anurag Kashyap's modern cult film Gangs of Wasseypur. Dhulia holds a master's degree in Theatre from the National School of Drama.

Early life and education
Dhulia was born and raised in Allahabad, Uttar Pradesh, India, where his father was a judge at the Allahabad High Court, while his mother was a professor of Sanskrit. He is the youngest of three brothers, one of whom later joined the Navy, while the other is a judge at the Supreme Court of India. He attended St. Joseph's College, Allahabad, then Allahabad University where he majored in English, Economics and Modern History. After graduating in 1986 he took a master's degree in Theatre at the National School of Drama in New Delhi, completing the course in 1989. His brother Sudhanshu Dhulia is a judge of the Supreme Court of India.

Career
In 1990 he moved to Mumbai where he worked as casting director on the film Bandit Queen, a Phoolan Devi biopic. He was casting director for 1995's Stiff Upper Lips, in which he also had a cameo role as a stallholder, and 2000's The Warrior, directed by Asif Kapadia.
Dhulia started his career by assisting Pradip Krishen in Electric Moon (1992) and Ketan Mehta in Sardar (1993). Thereafter he turned to television, and during the 90s Dhulia directed and produced several television programs, including the six-part Krishna's Dream for UK Channel Four. Kahani Ek Kanya Ki (1991) was written for Doordarshan, and Hum Bambai Nahin Jayenge (1993), for BI Television, was set in an acting school. 1996's Just Mohabbat was the story of a boy's coming-of-age, and Naya Daur (1995) adapted a classic Hindi novel by Bhagwati Charan Verma for Zee TV.

Dhulia's 1999 series Star Bestsellers, a sequence of six 45-minute short stories ("Ek Sham Ki Mulaqat", "Fursat Main", "Hum Saath Saath Hain Kya", "Anekon Hitler", "Musafir", and "Bhawaron Ne Khilaya Phool"), won him popular recognition. His 2005 comedy Who Dus Din, for Star TV, satirised the Indian film industry, while Ek Duje Ke Liye, produced the same year and also for Star TV, was an adaptation of Neil Simon's play The Odd Couple. He also directed the TV serial 'Rajdhaani' for Starplus featuring Neha Dhupia.

He directed his first feature film, Haasil in 2003, a love story set among politicised students in northern India. The film was critically well received and has gained a cult following. Haasil was nominated for six awards (including best directorial debut) at the Zee Cine Awards, where it won for best screenplay. His second film Charas: A Joint Operation was a thriller concerning drug cartels, shot in marijuana-growing regions of Himachal Pradesh.
In 2011, Tigmanshu has come up with two films – the first one being Shagird which released on 13 May and the second one was Saheb, Biwi Aur Gangster.

Dhulia's film Paan Singh Tomar released on 2 March 2012 and won him wide critical acclaim including National Film Award for Best Feature Film. He has announced four other upcoming projects, Saheb, Biwi Aur Gangster Returns (2013), Milan Talkies, Jai Ramji, Bullet Raja, and Sultana Daku.

Recently he has been honoured with the life membership of International Film And Television Club of Asian Academy of Film & Television by Sandeep Marwah President Marwah Films & Video Studios.

Tigmanshu had also started production and directing a film titled "Showman" starring Govinda. He was a big fan of Govinda and dreamed of directing a film on him. The film has been abandoned. Apart from directing and acting in films, Tigmanshu has now become a well-known YouTuber.

Filmography

Films

Television
As writer, director and an actor
Kahani Ek Kanya Ki – (1991) – Doordarshan
Krishna's Dream – (1993) – Channel Four
Hum Bambai Nahin Jayenge – (1993) – BI Television
Naya Daur – (1995) – Zee TV
Ek Shaam Ki Mulakaat – Star Bestsellers – Star Plus
Bhoron Ne Khilaya Phool – Star Bestsellers – Star Plus
Anekoe Hitlers – Star Bestsellers – Star Plus
Fursat Mein – Star Bestsellers – Star Plus
Hum Saath Saath Hain Kya? – Star Bestsellers – Star Plus
Musafir – Star Bestsellers – Star Plus
Yudh -(2014)- Sony TV
Kuch Toh Hai Tere Mere Darmiyaan (2015) – Star Plus as himself
 CID (2018) - Sony TV
 Criminal Justice(2019) - Hotstar - Directed the show
 The Great Indian Murder (2022) Disney+ Hotstar - Director

Web series

Awards
National Film Awards
National Film Award for Best Feature Film – Paan Singh Tomar – Director – 2013

Filmfare Awards
Filmfare Award for Best Screenplay – Paan Singh Tomar – 2013

Stardust Awards 
Best Director – Saheb, Biwi Aur Gangster – 2012

SAARC Film Festival
Best Director – Paan Singh Tomar- June 2013

References

External links

 
 
 
 

1967 births
Living people
Indian male screenwriters
Indian casting directors
Film directors from Uttar Pradesh
Indian television directors
University of Allahabad alumni
Artists from Allahabad
Screen Awards winners
Hindi-language film directors
National School of Drama alumni
21st-century Indian film directors
Screenwriters from Uttar Pradesh
Directors who won the Best Feature Film National Film Award